Abdullah al-Shami (born March 2, 1994) is a Syrian football player who is currently playing for Al-Fahaheel in the Kuwait Premier League.

References

1994 births
Living people
Association football defenders
Syrian footballers
Al Ahly SC players
Taliya SC players
Al Masry SC players
Expatriate footballers in Egypt
Syrian expatriates in Egypt
Syrian Premier League players
Al-Fahaheel FC players
Syrian expatriate sportspeople in Kuwait
Syrian expatriate sportspeople in Egypt
Egyptian Premier League players
Expatriate footballers in Kuwait